Malik Anthony Johnson (born April 13, 1998) is a Canadian soccer player.

Career

Club

Toronto FC II
Johnson joined TFC Academy in 2013 from Brampton East SC. Johnson made his debut for Toronto FC II  on July 8, 2015 against the Pittsburgh Riverhounds as an academy call-up. He would go on to sign his first professional contract with Toronto FC II on January 5, 2016.

He was called up to the Toronto FC squad on June 2, 2016 and made his debut in the Canadian Championship semi-finals. Johnson played in the final 10 minutes of a 4-2 win against Montreal Impact after replacing Mo Babouli. During the 2017 offseason, Johnson would train with Danish club HB Køge. Upon completion of the 2017 season, Toronto FC II would exercise the option on Johnson's contract for the 2018 season.

Tampa Bay Rowdies
After four seasons with Toronto FC II, Johnson would sign with fellow USL Championship club Tampa Bay Rowdies for the 2019 season. After missing the first two months of the season with a shoulder injury Johnson would make 23 starts and score 3 goals for the Rowdies in 2019, impressing coach Neill Collins during his first season in Tampa Bay. He would re-sign with the club for the 2020 season.

Real Monarchs
On January 29, 2021, Johnson joined USL Championship side Real Monarchs.

Colorado Springs Switchbacks
On December 11, 2021, it was announced Johnson would join USL Championship side Colorado Springs Switchbacks ahead of their 2022 season. After the 2022 season, the Switchbacks retained Johnson for the 2023 season, however, prior to the season in March he and the club agreed to mutually terminated his contract.

International
He was named to the U15 national team for the 2013 Copa de México de Naciones. Johnson was called up by coach Sean Fleming to the Canada U-17 team for the 2015 CONCACAF U-17 Championship. He made his debut for the U17s against the Haiti U-17 squad on February 28 as a substitute in the 74th minute. Johnson was named to the Canadian U-23 provisional roster for the 2020 CONCACAF Men's Olympic Qualifying Championship on February 26, 2020.

Career statistics

References

External links

 

1998 births
Living people
Association football midfielders
Association football forwards
Black Canadian soccer players
Canada men's youth international soccer players
Canadian sportspeople of Jamaican descent
Canadian soccer players
Colorado Springs Switchbacks FC players
Real Monarchs players
Soccer players from Toronto
Toronto FC II players
Toronto FC players
USL Championship players
Tampa Bay Rowdies players
Canadian expatriate soccer players
Expatriate soccer players in the United States
Canadian expatriate sportspeople in the United States